Trabutia is a genus of fungi in the family Phyllachoraceae.

The genus was circumscribed by Pier Andrea Saccardo and Casimir Roumeguère in Rev. Mycol. (Toulouse) vol.3 on pages 26-27 in 1881.

The genus name of Trabutia is in honour of Louis Charles Trabut (1853–1929), who was a French botanist and physician. He is remembered for his work involving the flora of Algeria and Tunisia.

Species
As accepted by Species Fungorum;

 Trabutia amboinensis 
 Trabutia amphigena 
 Trabutia austinii 
 Trabutia basanacanthea 
 Trabutia basanacantheana 
 Trabutia benguetensis 
 Trabutia bucidae 
 Trabutia calarcana 
 Trabutia conocephali 
 Trabutia conzattiana 
 Trabutia crotonicola 
 Trabutia crustosa 
 Trabutia distinguenda 
 Trabutia erythrinae 
 Trabutia erythrospora 
 Trabutia escalloniae 
 Trabutia granulata 
 Trabutia irosinensis 
 Trabutia lonicerae 
 Trabutia mangiferae 
 Trabutia mauritiae 
 Trabutia minima 
 Trabutia neurophila 
 Trabutia nothofagi 
 Trabutia pacifica 
 Trabutia pampulhae 
 Trabutia pithecellobii 
 Trabutia quercina 
 Trabutia quercus 
 Trabutia roupalae 
 Trabutia sinensis 
 Trabutia tosta 
 Trabutia xylosmae 

Former species; (most are family Phyllachoraceae)

 T. abyssinica  = Phyllachora abyssinica
 T. ambigua  = Phyllachora ambigua
 T. arrabidaeae  = Munkiella caa-guazu
 T. atroinquinans  = Phyllachora atroinquinans
 T. bauhiniae  = Phyllachora bauhiniae
 T. brasiliensis  = Phyllachora brasiliensis
 T. butleri  = Phyllachora butleri
 T. cayennensis  = Phyllachora cayennensis
 T. chinensis  = Phyllachora yatesii
 T. cocoicola  = Botryosphaeria cocoicola, Botryosphaeriaceae
 T. conica  = Phyllachora conica
 T. conspicua  = Phyllachora capparis
 T. constellata  = Hysterostomella spurcaria, Parmulariaceae
 T. danthoniae  = Phyllachora danthoniae
 T. dothideoides  = Phyllachora dothideoides
 T. elmeri  = Phyllachora banahaensis
 T. eucalypti  = Phyllachora eucalypti
 T. evansii  = Phyllachora howardiana
 T. fici-dekdekenae  = Phyllachora fici-dekdekenae
 T. fici-hochstetteri  = Phyllachora fici-hochstetteri
 T. ficuum  = Phyllachora ficuum
 T. guarapiensis  = Phyllachora paraguaya
 T. guazumae  = Phyllachora guazumae
 T. incrustans  = Phyllachora incrustans
 T. inimica  = Phyllachora inimica
 T. lagerheimiana  = Phyllachora lagerheimiana
 T. lantanae  = Anhellia lantanae, Myriangiaceae
 T. merrillii  = Phyllachora merrillii T. nervisequens  = Phyllachora nervisequens T. nervisequens var. robusta  = Phyllachora nervisequens T. novoguineensis  = Phyllachora novoguineensis T. osbeckiae  = Rehmiodothis osbeckiae T. parvicapsa  = Phyllachora parvicapsa T. phyllodii  = Polystigma phyllodii T. pittospori  = Phyllachora pittospori T. portoricensis  = Phyllachora portoricensis T. quercina var. terraciani  = Trabutia quercina T. randiae  = Phyllachora randiae T. randiae subsp. aculeatae  = Phyllachora randiae T. stephaniae  = Phyllachora stephaniae T. sycomori  = Phyllachora sycomori T. tonkinensis  = Phyllachora tonkinensis T. vernicosa  = Phyllachora fici-heterophyllae T. zanthoxyli  = Phyllachora winteri''

References

External links
Index Fungorum

Phyllachorales
Sordariomycetes genera
Taxa named by Casimir Roumeguère
Taxa named by Pier Andrea Saccardo